The Panasonic Open India was a golf tournament on the Asian Tour. It was first played in 2011.

Winners

Notes

References

External links
Coverage on the Asian Tour's official site

Former Asian Tour events
Golf tournaments in India
Recurring sporting events established in 2011
2011 establishments in Haryana